Stanton Center is a historic building at Annapolis, Anne Arundel County, Maryland, United States. It is a two-story (plus basement), Classical Revival brick masonry building with a one-story addition. It is the second school building on the site and was first used as an elementary school and later became the first high school for African Americans in Anne Arundel County. It remained in use as a school until the desegregation of the Anne Arundel County school system in the 1960s, when it became a community center.

Stanton Center was listed on the National Register of Historic Places in 1983.

References

External links
, including photo from 1982, at Maryland Historical Trust

African-American history in Annapolis, Maryland
Buildings and structures in Annapolis, Maryland
Neoclassical architecture in Maryland
School buildings completed in 1893
School buildings on the National Register of Historic Places in Maryland
National Register of Historic Places in Annapolis, Maryland